Subcancilla lindae is a species of sea snail, a marine gastropod mollusk, in the family Mitridae, the miters or miter snails.

Description
Original description: "Shell very narrow, elongated, with high, elevated spire; body whorl with 16 large, rounded, evenly-spaced spiral cords; suture impressed, producing tabulate whorls and stepped spire; sides of body whorl straight; aperture narrow; columella with 3 plications; (shell) color pure white; interior of aperture pure white."

Distribution
Locus typicus: "Golfo de Triste, off Puerto Cabello, Venezuela."

This species occurs in Venezuela.

References

lindae
Gastropods described in 1987